Dr. Robert Davila (born July 19, 1932) served as the ninth president of Gallaudet University, the world's only university in which all programs and services are specifically designed to accommodate deaf and hard of hearing students. His appointment came after the wake of the Unity for Gallaudet Movement protests of 2006, when many students, staff, and alumni objected to the initial choice of Jane Fernandes as the intended next president.  It was originally intended that he serve only 18–24 months as an interim president, but the Board dropped the interim designation and then extended his contract to 36 months.

Early life 
Robert Davila was born in southern California to Mexican-American parents who worked in fields and orchards.  At age eight, he contracted spinal meningitis and became deaf.  When his mother learned about a school for the deaf in northern California, she sent him alone on a journey to the California School for the Deaf in Berkeley (which later moved to Fremont).

Education 
Davila graduated from Gallaudet University, with a Bachelor's in Education in 1953.  He then went to Hunter College, graduating with a Master's in Special Education in 1963.  To complete his education, he attended and graduated from Syracuse University with a Ph.D. in Educational Technology in 1972. He also has received honorary degrees from Gallaudet, RIT, Stonehill College, and Hunter College.

Professional career 
Davila served as Assistant Secretary for the Office of Special Education and Rehabilitative Services of the US Department of Education from 1989 to 1993 during the administration of George H. W. Bush. Educationally, Dr. Davila has experience teaching high school math, being an assistant principal, serving as a K-12 superintendent. He worked as professor, a college administrator and Vice President of Gallaudet University in the 1970s and '80s. He was headmaster of the New York School for the Deaf at White Plains 1993 to 1996 as well as CEO of the National Technical Institute for the Deaf 1996 from 2006. On December 10, 2006, Davila was named the ninth President of Gallaudet, enacted at the start of 2007. He stepped down as president on December 31, 2009 and was succeeded by Dr. T. Alan Hurwitz.

Speeches and interviews
Davila, Robert R., Acceptance speech upon being selected President of Gallaudet University, 2006. (Download text of speech: http://saveourdeafschools.org/robert_davila_acceptance_speech_2006.pdf)

Davila, Robert. R., Interview on KCPW, Salt Lake City, Utah, expressing support for university students' right to protest, February 2007. (Download transcript of interview: http://saveourdeafschools.org/utah.pdf)

Davila, Robert R., Installation speech as Gallaudet's Ninth President, 2007.  (Download text of speech: http://saveourdeafschools.org/robert_davila_installation_speech_2007.pdf)

Davila, Robert R., Address at Gallaudet's 140th Commencement, May 15, 2009.  (Download text of speech: http://saveourdeafschools.org/robert_davila_commencement_address_2009.pdf)

Davila, Robert R., Keynote Address at National Association of the Deaf convention in Denver, Colorado, 1992. (Download text of speech: http://saveourdeafschools.org/davila_keynote_NAD_denver_1992.pdf)

Davila, Robert R., Plenary Address at PEPnet 2002: Biennial Conference on Postsecondary Education for Persons who are Deaf or Hard of Hearing. (Download text of speech: http://saveourdeafschools.org/robert_davila_2002.pdf)

Davila, Robert R., Interview on Deaf Mosaic, 1989. (Link: http://videocatalog.gallaudet.edu/?video=1695, beginning at 23:30.)

See also
Deaf Culture
Deaf President Now (1988)

References

External links
Biographical information from NTID
Davila Speaks at Convocation, Education Exchange (a publication of the School of Education, Syracuse University), Fall 2004, p. 13

Living people
1932 births
Educators of the deaf
Rochester Institute of Technology faculty
Rochester Institute of Technology administrators
Gallaudet University alumni
Presidents of Gallaudet University
Hunter College alumni
Syracuse University alumni
United States Department of Education officials
George H. W. Bush administration personnel
Gallaudet University
American academics of Mexican descent